In 2019, a scandal arose over a criminal conspiracy to influence undergraduate admissions decisions at several top American universities. The investigation into the conspiracy was code named Operation Varsity Blues. The investigation and related charges were made public on March 12, 2019, by United States federal prosecutors. At least 53 people have been charged as part of the conspiracy, a number of whom pleaded guilty or agreed to plead guilty. Thirty-three parents of college applicants were accused of paying more than $25million between 2011 and 2018 to William Rick Singer, organizer of the scheme, who used part of the money to fraudulently inflate entrance exam test scores and bribe college officials. Of the 32 parents named in a Federal Bureau of Investigation affidavit filed in U.S. District Court in Boston, more than half had apparently paid bribes to have their children enrolled at the University of Southern California (USC).

Singer controlled the two firms involved in the scheme, Key Worldwide Foundation and The Edge College & Career Network (also known as "The Key"). He pleaded guilty and cooperated with the Federal Bureau of Investigation (FBI) in gathering incriminating evidence against co-conspirators. He said he unethically facilitated college admission for children in more than 750 families. Singer faced up to 65 years in prison, and a fine of $1.25million. In January 2023, he was sentenced to three and a half years in prison plus forfeiture of over $10 million.

Prosecutors in the Office of the U.S. Attorney for the District of Massachusetts, led by United States Attorney Andrew Lelling, unsealed indictments and complaints for felony conspiracy to commit mail fraud and honest services mail fraud against 50 people, including Singer, who has been "portrayed [...] as a criminal mastermind", university staff he bribed, and parents who were alleged to have used bribery and fraud to secure admission for their children to 11 universities. Among the accused parents are prominent business-people and well-known actors. Those charges have a maximum term of 20 years in prison, supervised release of three years, and a $250,000 fine. One month later, 16 of the parents were also indicted by prosecutors for alleged felony conspiracy to commit money laundering. This third charge has a maximum sentence of 20 years in prison, supervised release of three years, and a $500,000 fine.

The investigation's name, Operation Varsity Blues, comes from a 1999 film of the same name. The case is the largest of its kind to be prosecuted by the US Justice Department.

Discovery and charges
The Federal Bureau of Investigation (FBI) alleged that beginning in 2011, 33 parents of high school students conspired with other people to use bribery and other forms of fraud to illegally arrange to have their children admitted to top colleges and universities. The first reporter was Julie Taylor-Vaz, a guidance counselor at Buckley School (a private school in Los Angeles), who in 2017 learned that a Buckley student identified as "Eliza" Bass – a pseudonym given by Vanity Fair – had been accepted to Tulane University, Georgetown University and Loyola Marymount University as an "African-American tennis whiz, ranked in the Top 10 in California," according to the report. However, "Eliza" was white and did not play tennis. Eliza's father, Adam J. Bass, a member of the Buckley School Board, initially denied that he had used an outside admissions consultant before finally admitting to Buckley that his family had hired Rick Singer, the Newport Beach, California man who became infamous in March for being at the heart of the admissions scandal. Bass was a business partner of Singer's and therefore did not have to pay any money to Singer. Authorities became aware of the scheme around April 2018 when Los Angeles businessman Morrie Tobin, who was under investigation in an unrelated case for alleged pump-and-dump conspiracy and securities fraud, offered information in exchange for leniency in the previously existing, unrelated case.

Tobin, who attended but did not graduate from Yale University, told authorities that the Yale women's soccer head coach, Rudolph "Rudy" Meredith, had asked him for $450,000 in exchange for helping his youngest daughter gain admission to the school. As part of his cooperation with the FBI, Tobin wore a recording device while talking to Meredith in a Boston hotel on April 12, 2018; Meredith subsequently agreed to cooperate with the authorities and led them to Singer. Meredith pleaded guilty as part of his cooperation with the prosecution. Tobin was not charged in this case, but in February 2019 he pleaded guilty in the unrelated securities fraud case. United States Federal Sentencing Guidelines, to which judges often refer when deciding sentences, call for between eight and ten years behind bars. According to The Wall Street Journal, Vanity Fair, and CBS, prosecutors recommended 36 months of supervised release. In addition, Tobin agreed to forfeit $4million as part of his plea deal. Tobin was scheduled for sentencing at a hearing in June 2019, but this did not in fact take place.

On March 12, 2019, federal prosecutors in Boston unsealed a criminal complaint charging 50 people with conspiracy to commit felony mail fraud and honest services mail fraud in violation of Title 18 United States Code, Section 1349. Those charges have a maximum term of 20 years in prison, supervised release of three years, and a $250,000 fine. The charges were announced by Andrew Lelling, United States Attorney for the District of Massachusetts. Assistant U.S. Attorneys Eric Rosen, Justin O'Connell, Leslie Wright, and Kristen Kearney of the securities and financial fraud unit were assigned as prosecutors of the case. FBI special agent Laura Smith signed the 204-page affidavit in support of the charges.

On April 9, 16 of the original 33 charged parents (Lori Loughlin, her husband Mossimo Giannulli, Gamal Aziz, Douglas M. Hodge, Bill McGlashan, Diane and Todd Blake, I-Hsin "Joey" Chen, Michelle Janavs, Elizabeth and Manuel Henriquez, Elisabeth Kimmel, Marci Palatella, John Wilson, Homayoun Zadeh and Robert Zangrillo), who had not pleaded guilty to the original charges, were additionally charged with conspiracy to commit money laundering by federal prosecutors in Boston in a superseding indictment. The indictment added those defendants to an existing case against David Sidoo, another of the 33 parents, that was already pending before Judge Nathaniel Gorton. The indictment alleged that the parents engaged in a conspiracy to launder bribes paid to Singer "by funneling them through Singer's purported charity and his for-profit corporation." This third charge has a maximum sentence of 20 years in prison, supervised release of three years, and a $500,000 fine.

In October 2021, two parents were convicted of buying their kids' way into school as athletic recruits in the first case to go to trial in the college admissions cheating scandal that embroiled prestigious universities across the country.

In February 2022, the two parents were sentenced respectively to 15 months and 1 month in jail as well as fines and community service.

In April 2022, the 2 Parents appeal their Convictions. The business executives John B. Wilson and Gamal Abdelaziz each received a long sentence, but in appeals, their lawyers say the key claim against them is legally flawed.

In June 2022, the final defendant in the investigation, Amin Khoury, was acquitted at trial of bribing a Georgetown University tennis coach to get his daughter into Georgetown. Khoury was accused of delivering $180,000 in a paper bag to the tennis coach  through a middleman. Khoury, who was represented by attorney Roy Black, was the only defendant in the Varsity Blues investigation to gain an acquittal.

As of November 2022, 2 cases remain active with conviction, sentence, suspensive appeal and the 2 appeals are being tested in court.

Allegations
Federal prosecutors alleged a college-admission scheme that involved:
 bribing exam administrators to facilitate cheating on college and university entrance exams;
 bribing coaches and administrators of elite universities to nominate unqualified applicants as elite recruited athletes, thus facilitating the applicants' admission;
 using a charitable organization to conceal the source and nature of laundered bribery payments.

Court documents unsealed in March 2019 detail a scheme led by William Rick Singer, at the time a 58-year-old resident of Newport Beach, California. Wealthy parents paid Singer to illegally arrange to have their children admitted to elite schools by bribing admissions testing officials, athletics staff, and coaches at universities. Payments were made to Key Worldwide Foundation, a nonprofit organization owned by Singer and previously granted 501(c)(3) status; that status allowed him to avoid federal income taxes on the payments, while parents could deduct their "donations" from their own personal taxes. Singer offered college counseling services as The Edge College & Career Network, a limited liability company registered in 2012, which he operated out of his home in Newport Beach.

Methods of fraudulent admission
Singer primarily used two fraudulent techniques to help clients' children gain admission to elite universities: cheating on college entrance exams and fabrication of elite sports credentials.

Cheating on college entrance exams
Singer arranged to allow clients' children to cheat on the SAT or ACT college admission tests. Singer worked with psychologists to complete the detailed paperwork required to falsely certify clients' children as having a learning disability; this in turn gave them access to accommodations, such as extra time, while taking the tests. Singer said he could obtain a falsified disability report from a psychologist for $4,000 to $5,000, and that the report could be re-used to fraudulently obtain similar benefits at the schools.

Once the paperwork was complete, Singer told clients to invent false travel plans to arrange to have their child's test locations moved to a test center under his control, either in West Hollywood or Houston. Parents might also be advised to fabricate a family event that could provide a pretense for the student to take the SAT, ACT, or other test at a private location where Singer could have complete control over the testing process.

In some cases, the student was involved directly in the fraud. In others, the fraud was kept secret from the student and corrupt proctors altered tests on their behalf after the fact. In some cases, other people posed as the students to take the tests. Mark Riddell, a Harvard alumnus and college admission exam preparation director at IMG Academy, was one of the stand-in test takers who took over two dozen exams; he pleaded guilty to one count of conspiracy to commit mail fraud and honest services mail fraud and one count of money laundering, and agreed to cooperate with investigators. Prosecutors said he was paid $10,000 per test, and the government was seeking to recover almost $450,000 from him in forfeiture. Riddell did not have advance access to the test papers, but was described as "just a really smart guy". He could be sentenced to up to 20 years in prison, but reportedly prosecutors said that because of his cooperation they would instead likely recommend 33 months' imprisonment at his November 1, 2019 (originally July 18) sentencing hearing.

According to recorded phone calls, the transcripts of which were included in court filings, Singer claimed that the practice of fraudulently obtaining accommodations such as extra testing time, intended for those with legitimate learning disabilities, was widespread outside of his particular scheme:

For example, Jane Buckingham was arrested on March 12, 2019, for allegedly submitting false paperwork saying her son had a learning disability; and paying $50,000 to Key Worldwide Foundation for a proctor to take the ACT on her son's behalf, scoring a 35 out of 36. The goal was entrance to the University of Southern California (USC). Portions of recorded conversations between Buckingham and a cooperating witness were included in the FBI's affidavit.

Fabrication of sports credentials
Singer also bribed college athletics staff and coaches. At certain colleges, these personnel can submit a certain number of sports recruit names to the admissions office, which then views those applications more favorably. Singer used his Key Worldwide Foundation as a money-laundering operation to pay coaches a bribe for labeling applicants as athletic recruits. He also fabricated profiles highlighting each applicant's purported athletic prowess. In some cases, image editing software (e.g., Adobe Photoshop) was used to insert a photograph of a student's face onto a photograph of another person participating in the sport to document purported athletic activity.

In one such incident, Michael Center, the men's tennis coach at the University of Texas (UT), accepted about $100,000 to designate an applicant as a recruit for the Texas Longhorns tennis team. A similar fraud occurred at Yale, where the then-head coach of the women's soccer team, Rudolph "Rudy" Meredith, allegedly accepted a $450,000 bribe to falsely identify an applicant as a recruit. USC's senior associate athletic director Donna Heinel and water polo coach Jovan Vavic allegedly received $1.3million and $250,000, respectively, for similar frauds. They were indicted alongside former USC women's soccer coaches Ali Khosroshahin and Laura Janke. Coaches at two other Pac-12 programs, University of California, Los Angeles (UCLA) men's soccer coach Jorge Salcedo and Stanford University sailing coach John Vandemoer, were charged with accepting bribes. Vandemoer admitted that he accepted $270,000 to classify two applicants as prospective sailors, and agreed to plead guilty to a charge of racketeering conspiracy. At Wake Forest, head volleyball coach William "Bill" Ferguson was placed on administrative leave following charges of racketeering. Former Georgetown University tennis coach Gordon "Gordie" Ernst is alleged to have facilitated as many as 12 students through fraudulent means while accepting bribes of up to $950,000. On March 20, 2019, the University of San Diego (USD) revealed that its former men's basketball head coach Lamont Smith allegedly accepted bribes. Hours after that revelation, Smith resigned from his position as assistant coach at the University of Texas at El Paso. Two San Diego families were accused of paying $875,000 as part of the scheme.

Bill McGlashan, a private equity investor, allegedly discussed using Adobe Photoshop to create a fake profile for his son as a football kicker to help him get into USC. Similarly, Marci Palatella, wife of former San Francisco 49ers player Lou Palatella, allegedly conspired with Singer to pass her son off as a long snapper recruit for USC. In one of the most notable cases, actress Lori Loughlin, famous for her role on the American sitcom Full House and the drama When Calls the Heart, and her husband, fashion designer Mossimo Giannulli of Mossimo fashion, allegedly paid $500,000 in bribes to arrange to have their two daughters accepted into USC as members of the rowing team, although neither girl had participated in the sport. On March 13, 2019, media sources reported that, when news of the scandal broke, Loughlin's younger daughter was on Rick Caruso's yacht in the Bahamas with her friend, Gianna, Caruso's daughter. Caruso is the chairman of the USC Board of Trustees.

Singer pleaded guilty on March 12, 2019, in the U.S. District Court in Boston to four felony counts of conspiracy to commit money laundering, conspiracy to defraud the United States, and obstruction of justice for alerting a number of subjects to the investigation after he began cooperating with the government. He faced up to 65 years in prison and a fine of $1.25million. He was sentenced in January 2023, with federal prosecutors asking for six years in prison and Singer's attorneys asking for home detention and community service. Judge Rya Zobel sentenced him to three and a half years in prison, with an additional three years probation as well as over $10 million in restitution to the IRS and forfeiture of millions of dollars in assets. Singer apologized for his actions, saying "I lost my ethical values and have so much regret. To be frank, I’m ashamed of myself."

Involved parties and organizations

A total of 50 people have been charged in the investigations. This number includes 33 parents of college applicants and 11 named collegiate coaches or athletic administrators from eight universities. Numerous other universities were not implicated in the scandal but were themselves victims of Singer's and his clients' actions, such as by considering applications of students with fraudulent test scores.

Key Worldwide Foundation / The Edge College & Career Network
 William Rick Singer, purported college counselor, and author of self-help books for college admission. Singer organized and sold fraudulent college admission services. Singer pleaded guilty and cooperated with the prosecution.
 Mark Riddell, a Harvard alumnus and former director of college entrance exams at IMG Academy. Riddell was paid by Singer to fraudulently take admission tests, impersonating the clients' children; he also paid College Board (which develops and administers the SAT and related tests), Educational Testing Service, and ACT contractors to deliberately mis-administer the tests. He was fired from IMG Academy and pleaded guilty.
 Steven Masera, officer at Singer's companies. Pleaded guilty to conspiracy to commit racketeering.
 Mikaela Sanford, employee at Singer's companies. Pleaded guilty to conspiracy to commit racketeering.

Other involved conspirators
 Igor Dvorskiy, administrator of standardized tests (including those from ACT and the College Board), and director of an LA-area private school. Pleaded guilty to conspiracy to commit racketeering.
 Martin Fox, Houston tennis academy president. Pleaded guilty to conspiracy to commit racketeering. Sentenced to 3 months in prison, 15 months' supervised release with 3 months' home confinement, $95,000 fine, forfeiture of $245,000 & 250 hours of community service.
 Niki Williams, administrator of standardized tests for ACT and College Board, Houston-area assistant high school teacher. Pleaded guilty to mail and wire fraud.

Universities and accused personnel 
The following universities, their associated athletic programs, and 11 university personnel were involved in the case:

Parents 
Officials said Singer had many legitimate clients, who did not engage in any fraud. Singer cited famous clients on his Facebook page while promoting his 2014 book Getting In and, as a result of this and other public endorsements by Singer, many former clients have made statements to distance themselves and their children from any perceived involvement in the scandal.

The table below lists parents in connection with the nationwide college admissions prosecution as listed by CNN, CBS News, and People. Morrie Tobin is not included in the above total due to the fact that he is an unindicted cooperating witness supporting the prosecution's case. To date, 38 of the indicted parents have either pleaded guilty or have been convicted.

Responses
In response to the scandal, the National Collegiate Athletic Association (NCAA), the chief governing body for college sports in the United States, announced plans to review the allegations "to determine the extent to which NCAA rules may have been violated".

U.S. Senator Ron Wyden (D-OR), of the Senate Finance Committee, plans to sponsor a bill making donations to schools taxable if the donor has children attending or applying to the college. Separately, Senators Chris Coons (D-DE) and Johnny Isakson (R-GA) have agreed to reintroduce 2017 legislation that imposes a fine on colleges and universities that have the smallest proportion of low-income students.

One of the parents who was convicted, Robert Zangrillo, was pardoned by President Donald Trump on his final day in office.

Extrajudicial actions
Indicted coaches were fired or suspended, or had already left the university at the time of the charges. Mark Riddell, who took tests on behalf of the students, was suspended from his position as director of college entrance exam preparation at IMG Academy and fired a week later.

On March 12, 2019, William Singer, the CEO of Edge College & Career Network who masterminded the scandal, pleaded guilty to four criminal charges involving racketeering conspiracy, money laundering conspiracy, conspiracy to defraud the U.S. government and obstruction of justice. On January 4th 2023, William Singer was sentenced to 3.5 years in federal prison, 3 years of supervised release, and forfeiture of over $10 million. 

On March 26, 2019, Yale became the first university to rescind the admission of a student associated with the scandal. On April 2, Stanford announced they also expelled a student connected to the fraud. In July 2020, Grand Canyon University ended its relationship with Singer, who was enrolled as a student of the university's psychiatric school since November 2019.

Actress Felicity Huffman formally pleaded guilty to honest services fraud, which involved hiring someone to test SAT scores while using the name of her daughter Sophia, on May 13, 2019, and on September 13 she was sentenced to 14 days in jail, one year of supervised release, fined $30,000 and ordered to undertake 250 hours of community service. On October 15, 2019, Huffman reported to the Federal Correctional Institution in Dublin, California, to begin her sentence. She was meant to be released from prison on October 27, 2019, but was released two days early because October 27 fell on a weekend. As of October 2020, when Huffman completed her full sentence, no charges had been filed against Huffman's husband and Sophia's father, actor and director William H. Macy.

The Hallmark Channel cut its ties to Lori Loughlin, star of the program Garage Sale Mystery and When Calls the Heart, after she was named as a parent in the indictments. According to The Hill, Netflix decided to drop Loughlin from Fuller House as well. Her younger daughter Olivia Jade also lost her partnerships with TRESemmé and the Sephora chain of beauty products. It was reported by TMZ, Page Six, and others that Loughlin's daughters dropped out of USC due to fears of being "viciously bullied"; however, a USC spokesperson confirmed in March that they both remained enrolled at the school, but in October the school's registrar stated they were no longer enrolled. According to the San Jose Mercury News, USC scheduled a hearing in March 2019 to determine if Olivia Jade should be designated a "disruptive individual", which would result in her lifetime ban from the university's campus and properties. Loughlin was found guilty and began serving a two-month prison sentence on October 30, 2020. Giannulli, who was also found guilty, began serving a five-month prison sentence on November 19, 2020.

On September 8, 2021, the scandal's first criminal trial, which saw parents John Wilson and Gamal Aziz as defendants, officially began, with jury selection commencing in a Boston federal court. This trial was centered around phony credentials which the two defendants paid to admit their children into the University of Southern California. Both men were convicted by a jury on October 8, 2021, after 10 hours of deliberation.

On March 10, 2022, the first criminal trial involving a former coach, former USC water polo coach Jovan Vavic, got underway in the same Boston federal court as well. Vavic was the only coach implicated in the case who opted to challenge the charges brought against him in court. On April 9, 2022, a federal jury in Boston convicted Vavic of fraud and bribery. On September 15, 2022, Vavic's conviction was overturned, with Boston-based U.S. District Judge Indira Talwani ruling that evidence presented at trial did not determine that the payments “served the defendants’ interests and harmed the university’s,” and a new trial was ordered.

Lawsuits
Multiple lawsuits were immediately filed against universities and individuals. Three students from Tulane University, Rutgers University, and a California community college filed a complaint against Singer and the affected universities that they hope will be certified as a class-action suit. A Stanford undergraduate claimed a loss for the time and money she spent applying to schools named in the scandal, as well as the possibility that the stain on Stanford's reputation would decrease the value of her degree. A parent filed a $500 billion civil suit in San Francisco against all the indicted individuals, claiming that her son was denied admission to some schools because of other parents buying access.

Related cases
In November 2020, former Harvard University fencing coach Peter Brand and Harvard parent Jie "Jack" Zhao were indicted on bribery and conspiracy to commit honest services wire fraud after a series of investigative articles in The Boston Globe. Although the alleged crimes are not connected to Rick Singer or the broader Varsity Blues conspiracy, the case's discovery and eventual prosecution has been credited to the increased scrutiny on admissions practices that resulted from the greater fallout of the scandal. Both defendants have denied the charges, and the trial is scheduled to begin in December 2022.

Commentary
After the scandal broke, multiple American news sources including The Atlantic, Vox, Rolling Stone, and The New York Times characterized it as a symptom of a broken college admissions system. Alan Dershowitz, professor emeritus at Harvard Law School, said it was "the worst scandal involving elite universities in the history of the United States". Elizabeth Warren, United States Senator from Massachusetts (where all the criminal cases were filed), told news media that the scandal represented "just one more example of how the rich and powerful know how to take care of their own".

Much of the news coverage attempted to explain why anyone would have been tempted by Singer's scheme. A common attribute among the defendants was that many were rich, but not ultra-rich. According to The New York Times, college admissions at certain elite American universities had become so selective that a family would have to make a minimum donation of $10million to inspire an admission committee to take a second look at their child, and even for families of such means, there would be no guarantee of return on investment, while Singer was selling certainty. In open court, he said: "I created a guarantee." The Los Angeles Times explained that there was probably also a social signaling element at work, in that admission to an elite university based purely upon an applicant's apparent merit publicly validates both the child's innate talent and the parents' own parenting skills in a way that an admission coinciding with a sizable donation does not.

In turn, others examined why certain universities had become so selective in the first place. The Atlantic pointed out that college seats are not scarce in the United States, except at a handful of universities which became selective on purpose: "[S]carcity has the added benefit of increasing an institution's prestige. The more students who apply, and the fewer students who get in, the more selective an institution becomes, and, subsequently, the more prestigious. And parents are clawing over one another to get a taste of the social capital that comes with that." Arizona State University (ASU) president Michael M. Crow described the "crisis of access to these social-status-granting institutions" as a full-blown "hysteria". It was alleged in court filings that one of the defendant parents had named ASU as a university they were specifically trying to avoid; the non-selective university has been the "butt of jokes" in American television shows for many years, as well as the 2015 film Ted 2. The inevitable result, according to Newsweek, was that the most elite institutions had created a situation in which purely meritocratic admissions had become impossible because they were already turning away too many overqualified candidates—former Harvard president Drew Gilpin Faust had once said, "we could fill our class twice over with valedictorians." It was also recognized that any workable long-term solution would need to alleviate the underlying anxiety driving the crisis, either by restructuring the college admissions process or the American labor market.

HuffPost explained that such anxiety barely exists in Canada, whose four-year universities do not show such extreme disparities in selectivity and prestige, and in turn, most Canadian employers do not rigidly discriminate between job candidates based upon where they graduated. In contrast, selective American universities have evolved into gatekeepers for the highest echelons of certain socially prestigious and financially lucrative industries like law and finance. University of Oklahoma history professor Wilfred M. McClay told Newsweek: "I'm not going to pretend there isn't a difference between Harvard and Suffolk County Community College, but I think this situation where the Supreme Court is made up entirely of Harvard or Yale Law School graduates is wrong. The thing driving the current scandal seems to be that ultimately parents were willing to do anything to game the system to get their kids these advantages, not because the education was better but because the legitimation of social position would be better."

Writing for The Washington Post, psychologists Jonathan Wai, Matt Brown and Christopher Chabris cited research on the predictive powers of the SAT and the doubtful value of costly SAT preparation programs, and concluded, "If the SAT were nothing but a wealth test, then Lori Loughlin, Mossimo Giannulli and other super-rich parents would not have had to cheat to get their kids into the latter two schools. In reality, they had to fake intellectual ability—the one thing they could not buy."

Documentaries and adaptation
In 2019, Lifetime produced and broadcast a television film about this event called The College Admissions Scandal. The film stars Penelope Ann Miller as Caroline DeVere, Mia Kirshner as Bethany Slade, and Michael Shanks as Rick Singer. In 2019, Lifetime also released a documentary called Beyond the Headlines: The College Admissions Scandal with Gretchen Carlson.

On April 4, 2019, three weeks after Operation Varsity Blues' charges were made public, Granite Bay High School debuted Ranked, a new musical. The show, written from 2018 to 2019 by the school's drama teacher and musical director, focused on academic pressure in schools, specifically telling the story of a student whose parents were paying for his grades without his knowledge. The timing of the musical's debut in relation to the scandal was serendipitous, and earned the high school national attention. Rick Singer worked in the Granite Bay community a decade prior as a college coach for local high school students.

A fictionalized account of the events was in the book Admissions by Julie Buxbaum, released on December 1, 2020. It tells the story from the point of view of the child of a fictional actress who was charged.

Netflix released a documentary on the subject, Operation Varsity Blues: The College Admissions Scandal, in 2021, mostly focusing on Singer, played by Matthew Modine.

In 2021, Casey Lyons and Caroline Miller wrote and self-produced Bars of Ivy: The College Admissions Scandal Musical about the scandal from the perspective of a student affected by it.

See also
 National Association for College Admission Counseling
 University of Bristol admissions controversy
 University of Illinois clout scandal
 University of Texas at Austin admissions controversy
 Legacy preferences

Notes

References

External links 
 Investigations of College Admissions and Testing Bribery Scheme, United States Department of Justice – contains charging documents and case status of all defendants criminally implicated in the scandal
 District Court dockets:
 United States v. Abbott, et al., No. 1:19-mj-06087 (D. Mass.)
 United States v. Sidoo, et al., No. 1:19-cr-10080 (D. Mass.)
 In re Operation Varsity Blues Prosecution, No. 1:19-mc-91134 (D. Mass.)
 The Key Worldwide Foundation website, archived

2019 controversies in the United States
2019 in American law
Academic scandals
Bribery scandals
Cheating in school
Corruption in the United States
Fraud in the United States
Georgetown University
Harvard University
Honest services fraud
Mail and wire fraud
March 2019 events in the United States
Northwestern University
Scandals in the United States
Stanford University
University and college admissions
University of California, Berkeley
University of California, Los Angeles
University of San Diego
University of Southern California
University of Texas at Austin
Wake Forest University
Yale University